A Very Special Christmas 5 is the fifth in the A Very Special Christmas series of Christmas-themed compilation albums produced to benefit the Special Olympics. Several of the album's tracks were recorded live in Washington, D.C. in December 2000 at a benefit concert hosted by then-President Bill Clinton and First Lady Hillary Clinton. The album was released on 30 October 2001, with production supervision by Bobby Shriver, Jon Bon Jovi, and Joel Gallen for A&M Records. It peaked at #112 on December 2001 Billboard album chart.

Track listing
 "This Christmas (Hang All the Mistletoe)" – Macy Gray
 "Little Drummer Boy/Hot Hot Hot" – Wyclef Jean
 "Noel! Noel!" – Eve 6
 "Blue Christmas" – Jon Bon Jovi
 "Merry Christmas Baby" – Stevie Wonder & Wyclef Jean
 "O Come All Ye Faithful" – City High
 "Christmas Is the Time to Say I Love You" – SR-71
 "Christmas Day" – Dido
 "Run Rudolph Run" – Sheryl Crow
 "Back Door Santa" – B.B. King & John Popper
 "Little Red Rooster" – Tom Petty & the Heartbreakers
 "Christmas Don't Be Late (Chipmunk Song)" – Powder
 "Silent Night" – Stevie Nicks
 "I Love You More" – Stevie Wonder & Kimberly Brewer
 "White Christmas" – Darlene Love

External links
A Very Special Christmas 5 at Amazon.com
Special Olympics: A Very Special Christmas

2001 Christmas albums
2001 compilation albums
A&M Records compilation albums
Interscope Records compilation albums
A Very Special Christmas